Acoustic streaming is a steady flow in a fluid driven by the absorption of high amplitude acoustic oscillations.  This phenomenon can be observed near sound emitters, or in the standing waves within a Kundt's tube. Acoustic streaming was explained first by Lord Rayleigh in 1884.
It is the less-known opposite of sound generation by a flow.

There are two situations where sound is absorbed in its medium of propagation:
  during  propagation in bulk flow ('Eckart streaming'). This effect is more intense at elevated frequencies and is much greater in air (where attenuation occurs on a characteristic distance ~10 cm at 1 MHz) than in water (~100 m at 1 MHz). In air it is known as the Quartz wind.
  near a  boundary ('Rayleigh streaming'). Either when sound reaches a boundary, or when a boundary is vibrating in a still medium. A wall vibrating parallel to itself generates a shear wave, of attenuated amplitude within the Stokes oscillating boundary layer.  This effect is localised on an attenuation length of  characteristic size  whose order of magnitude is a few micrometres in both air and  water at 1 MHz. The streaming flow generated due to the interaction of sound waves and microbubbles, elastic polymers, and even biological cells are examples of boundary driven acoustic streaming.

Rayleigh streaming
Consider a plane standing sound wave that corresponds to the velocity field  where . Let the characteristic (transverse) dimension of the problem be . The flow field just described corresponds to inviscid flow. However viscous effects will be important close to a solid wall; there then exists a boundary layer of thickness or, penetration depth . In addition, the characteristic time scale within the boundary layer is very large (because of the smallness of ) in comparison with the acoustic time scale . These observations imply that the flow in the boundary layer may be regarded as incompressible. 

The unsteady, incompressible boundary-layer equation is

where the right-hand side terms correspond to the pressure gradient imposed on the boundary layer.

In the first approximation, one obtains

where  and  

The equation at the next order is

Let us find solution that corresponds only to this time-independent part. This leads to  where  satisfies the equation

 

where prime denotes differentiation with respect to  The boundary condition at the wall implies that  As ,  must be finite. Integrating the above equation twice gives

 

As ,  leading to the result that  Thus, at the edge of the boundary, there is a steady fluid motion superposed on the oscillating motion. This velocity forcing will drive a steady streaming motion outside the boundary layer.

The outer steady streaming incompressible motion will depend on the geometry of the problem.

which corresponds a periodic array of counter-rotating vortices, as shown in the figure.

Origin: a body force due to acoustic absorption in the fluid 
Acoustic streaming is a non-linear effect.  

We can decompose the velocity field in a vibration part and a steady part  .
The vibration part  is due to sound, while the steady part is the acoustic streaming velocity (average velocity).
The Navier–Stokes equations implies for the acoustic streaming velocity:

The steady streaming originates from a steady body force  that appears on the right hand side. This force is a function of what is known as the Reynolds stresses in turbulence . The Reynolds stress depends on the amplitude of sound vibrations, and the body force reflects diminutions in this sound amplitude.

We see that this stress is non-linear (quadratic)  in the velocity amplitude. It is non-vanishing only where the velocity amplitude varies. 
.

Order of magnitude of acoustic streaming velocities 
Even if viscosity is responsible for acoustic streaming, the value of viscosity disappears from the resulting streaming velocities in the case of near-boundary acoustic steaming.

The order of magnitude of streaming velocities are:
 near a boundary (outside of the boundary layer):

with  the sound vibration velocity and  along the wall boundary. The flow is directed towards decreasing sound vibrations (vibration nodes).

 near a vibrating bubble of rest radius a, whose radius pulsates with relative amplitude  (or ), and whose center of mass also periodically translates with relative amplitude  (or ).  with a phase shift 

 far from walls  far from the origin of the flow ( with the acoustic power,  the dynamic viscosity and  the celerity of sound).

 it has been shown that even biological species, e.g., adherent cells, can also exhibit acoustic streaming flow when exposed to acoustic waves. Cells adhered to a surface can generate acoustic streaming flow in the order of mm/s without being detached from the surface.

References

Acoustics
Sound